The ABA Claudia Wilds Award for Distinguished Service is an award given by the American Birding Association to a member who has given "long and useful service to the organization," either as a volunteer or as compensated staff, in recognition of the member's dedicated energy and years of service. 

One of five awards presented by the ABA for contributions to birding, the award is named in honor of Claudia Wilds (1931-1997), who made many contributions to ornithology and the ABA.  Wilds was author of an important birdfinding guide to the mid-Atlantic states and co-author of a handbook of the world's terns and skimmers, completed after her death.  Wilds served on the board of the ABA, was an associate editor of Birding magazine, wrote articles for The Audubon Society Master Guide to Birding, and was a consultant in the preparation of the National Geographic Society's field guide. She herself was posthumously awarded the ABA's Ludlow Griscom Award in 1998.

The Claudia Wilds Award was first bestowed on Larry Balch.

List of recipients
The award was introduced in 2000.

Source:

See also

 List of ornithology awards

References

Ornithology awards

Long service medals
American Birding Association